Spring Lake is an unincorporated community in Spring Lake Township, Scott County, Minnesota, United States.

Spring Lake also refers to the lake within the community.

References

Unincorporated communities in Scott County, Minnesota
Unincorporated communities in Minnesota